Jean Sybil La Fontaine FRAI (born 1 November 1931) is a British anthropologist and emeritus professor of the London School of Economics. She has done research in Africa and the UK, on topics including ritual, gender, child abuse, witchcraft and satanism. In 1994 she wrote a government report: The Extent and Nature of Organised and Ritual Abuse.

Early life
La Fontaine was born in Nairobi, Kenya, on 1 November 1931 and educated at Kenya High School for Girls, Nairobi. She then studied at Newnham College, Cambridge, gaining a B.A. in archaeology and anthropology in 1953 and a Ph.D. in 1957.

Career
After teaching at King's College, Newcastle (1961, part-time), Lovanium University, Zaire (1962-1963) and Birkbeck College (1965-1968), La Fontaine was appointed Reader in Anthropology at the London School of Economics in 1968 and Professor of Anthropology there in 1978. She retired in 1983, being granted the title of professor emeritus. Professor La Fontaine was president of the Royal Anthropological Institute from 1985 to 1987.

Recognition
La Fontaine has received honorary doctorates from University of Linkoping, Sweden, in 1999, the Open University in 2003, and Goldsmiths, University of London in 2008.

References

External links
 interviewed by Jack Goody 15 December 1982 (video)

1931 births
Living people
Academics of the London School of Economics
Alumni of Newnham College, Cambridge
Alumni of Kenya High School
British anthropologists
British women academics
People from Nairobi
Fellows of the Royal Anthropological Institute of Great Britain and Ireland
Presidents of the Royal Anthropological Institute of Great Britain and Ireland